The 1955 Toronto Argonauts finished in third place in the Interprovincial Rugby Football Union with a 4–8 record.  They appeared in the IRFU Final, but lost to the Montreal Alouettes.

Regular season

Standings

Schedule

Postseason

References

Toronto Argonauts seasons
1955 Canadian football season by team